Vladimír Šmilauer (5 December 1895, Plzeň – 13 October 1983, Prague) was a Czech linguist, Bohemist and Slovakist.

Biography
Vladimír Šmilauer was born on 5 December 1895. He studied Czech and German at the Faculty of Arts of the Charles University in Prague. From 1921 to 1938 he worked as a high school professor. In 1938 he was appointed professor at Charles University. During the German occupation, he left his job at Charles University and worked at the Slavonic Institute in Prague. After World War II, he returned to the university.

His main research interests were the theory of word formation, syntax, and Czech and Slovak toponymy.

Works 
 Vodopis starého Slovenska, Praha-Bratislava 1932
 Osídlení a národnost Spiše, Bratislava 1935
 Co nového v Pravidlech českého pravopisu 1941?, Praha 1943
 Novočeská skladba, Praha 1947 (2. vyd. 1966)
 Osídlení Čech ve světle místních jmen, Praha 1960
 Úvod do toponomastiky, Praha 1963 (2. vyd. 1966)
 Příručka slovanské toponomastiky I–II, Praha 1963–1964
 Příručka slovanské toponomastiky – Handbuch des slawischen Toponomastik, Praha 1970
 Novočeské tvoření slov, Praha 1971
 Nauka o českém jazyku, Praha 1972

References

Citations

Bibliography 
 Antonín Dostál: „Vědecké dílo profesora Vladimíra Šmilauera“, Slavica Pragensia VIII, Praha 1966, p. 5–16.
 Lumír Klimeš: „Profesor Vladimír Šmilauer – vědec a učitel“, in: Jazyk a literatura XVII. Sborník katedry českého jazyka a literatury. Západočeská univerzita v Plzni. Fakulta pedagogická. Plzeň 2000, p. 1–7.
 Eva Milavcová: „Soupis prací profesora Vladimíra Šmilauera“, Slavica Pragensia VIII, Praha 1966, str. 381–413.
 Marie Nováková-Šlajsová: „Onomastika ve vědeckém díle profesora Vladimíra Šmilauera. Bibliografický soupis“, in: Zpravodaj místopisné komise ČSAV 24, 1983, č. 4/5, str. 170–183.

External links

 Vladimír Šmilauer (1895–1983) – bibliography

1895 births
1983 deaths
Academic staff of Charles University
Linguists from the Czech Republic
20th-century linguists